Now and Again is a 1999-2000 American television series.

Now and Again may also refer to:

 Now and Again (Daryle Singletary album)
 Now and Again (The Grapes of Wrath album)